João Soares Cardoso (born 27 September 1951 in Sacavém) is a former Portuguese footballer who played as a defender.

Cardoso gained 8 caps for the Portugal national team.

External links 
 

1951 births
Living people
C.F. Os Belenenses players
S.C. Braga players
Portugal international footballers
Portuguese footballers
Primeira Liga players
Association football defenders